Polysternon is a genus of turtles in the extinct family Bothremydidae. It was described by Portis in 1882, and contains the species P. provinciale (originally placed in the genus Pleurosternon), which existed during the Cretaceous of what is now France; P. atlanticum, which existed during the Cretaceous at Laño in what is now Spain, and a new species, P. isonae, from the Late Maastrichtian of Spain.

The species epithet of P. isonae refers to the municipality Isona i Conca Dellà in Catalonia, where the type specimen was discovered in the Tremp Formation.

Species 
 Polysternon provinciale Matheron, 1869
 Polysternon atlanticum Lapparent de Broin & Murelaga, 1996
 Polysternon isonae Marmi et al., 2012

Distribution 
Fossils of Polysternon have been found in:
 Rognacian Formation - France
 Vitoria, Sierra Perenchiza and Tremp Formations - Spain

References

External links 
 Polysternon at the Paleobiology Database

Prehistoric turtle genera
Late Cretaceous turtles
Maastrichtian life
Late Cretaceous reptiles of Europe
Cretaceous France
Fossils of France
Cretaceous Spain
Fossils of Spain
Tremp Formation
Fossil taxa described in 1882
Extinct turtles